Green Knoll is an unincorporated community and census-designated place (CDP) located within Bridgewater Township, in Somerset County, New Jersey, United States. As of the 2010 United States Census, the CDP's population was 6,200.

Geography
According to the United States Census Bureau, Green Knoll had a total area of 4.710 square miles (12.199 km2), including 4.707 square miles (12.191 km2) of land and 0.003 square miles (0.008 km2) of water (0.07%).

Demographics

Census 2010

References

Bridgewater Township, New Jersey
Census-designated places in Somerset County, New Jersey